Saula Radidi (born 4 June 1984 in Nausori, Fiji) is a Fijian rugby union footballer.  He plays as a centre for the Fijian national team. He was selected to represent Fiji against Australia during the 2010 June tours.

He has played his rugby both in Fiji and in New Zealand. His test debut was against the New Zealand Maori and took place at the Churchill Park stadium in Lautoka. He was part of the 2013 IRB Pacific Nations Cup winning side.

See also
Fiji Warriors
2008 IRB Pacific Nations Cup

External links
 Profile of Saula Radidi

1984 births
Living people
Fijian rugby union players
People from Nausori
I-Taukei Fijian people
Fiji international rugby union players
Rugby union centres